East Mediterranean Gas Company (EMG) is an owner and operator of thePeace Pipileine Al Arish–Ashkelon pipeline.  EMG is a joint company of Mediterranean Gas Pipeline Ltd MGPC which belongs to "Evsen Group of Companies" (17%), EMED BV (39%), East Gas Company EGC (9%), and the Egyptian General Petroleum Corporation (10%).

EMG was established in the year 2000 to export the Egyptian Natural Gas to Israel, the project commenced to export the gas in the year 2008, during the year 2012 the Gas Supply Agreement to EMG was terminated. 

In the year 2019 EMG sites was adjusted to allow natural gas flow from Israel to Egypt, natural gas commenced to flow in the peace pipeline to Egypt during 2020.

References

Oil and gas companies of Egypt
Natural gas pipeline companies